Oglesby is a city in Coryell County, Texas, United States. The population was 484 at the 2010 census. It is part of the Killeen–Temple–Fort Hood Metropolitan Statistical Area.

Geography

Oglesby is located in eastern Coryell County at  (31.418901, –97.510144).

Demographics

As of the census of 2000, there were 458 people, 174 households, and 120 families residing in the city. The population density was 930.1 people per square mile (360.9/km). There were 194 housing units at an average density of 394.0/sq mi (152.9/km). The racial makeup of the city was 91.70% White, 1.53% Native American, 6.55% from other races, and 0.22% from two or more races. Hispanic or Latino of any race were 11.35% of the population.

There were 174 households, out of which 36.2% had children under the age of 18 living with them, 51.1% were married couples living together, 11.5% had a female householder with no husband present, and 30.5% were non-families. 28.7% of all households were made up of individuals, and 19.5% had someone living alone who was 65 years of age or older. The average household size was 2.63 and the average family size was 3.24.

In the city, the population was spread out, with 28.4% under the age of 18, 8.1% from 18 to 24, 26.9% from 25 to 44, 23.6% from 45 to 64, and 13.1% who were 65 years of age or older. The median age was 36 years. For every 100 females, there were 90.0 males. For every 100 females age 18 and over, there were 83.2 males.

The median income for a household in the city was $26,429, and the median income for a family was $35,000. Males had a median income of $27,500 versus $18,056 for females. The per capita income for the city was $17,433. About 9.8% of families and 13.1% of the population were below the poverty line, including 15.7% of those under age 18 and 20.3% of those age 65 or over.

Education
The city is served by the Oglesby Independent School District and is home to the Oglesby School Tigers.

References

External links
Oglesby Independent School District

Cities in Texas
Cities in Coryell County, Texas
Killeen–Temple–Fort Hood metropolitan area